Khatpura is a small village in Awan Patti, Muzaffarabad, Azad Kashmir. Khatpura is the starting village of Awan Patti. Khatpura Awan Patti is opposite to Garhi Dopatta Degree College other side of Jhelum River.

See also
Garhi Dopatta
Kayian

References

Populated places in Muzaffarabad District